Ultraman is a three-day, 515 km (320 mile) multisport race modelled on the one held annually on the Big Island of Hawaii which is now called the  Ultraman World Championship. "Ultraman" is a branding for events affiliated with the Hawaii original. Each race is divided into three stages over three days: The first is a 6.2-mile (10-km) ocean swim from Kailua Bay to Keauhou Bay, followed by a 90-mile (145-km) cross-country bike ride, with vertical climbs that total 6,000 feet.  Stage two is a 171.4-mile (276-km) bike ride from Volcanoes National Park to Kohala Village Inn in Hawi, with total vertical climbs of 4,000 feet.  Stage three is a 52.4-mile (84-km) double-marathon, which starts at Hawi and finishes on the beach at the Old Kona Airport State Recreation Area.  Each stage must be completed within 12 hours or less.  The swim portion of stage one must be completed in 5.5 hours or less.  Competitors who do not reach the finish lines within the time limits are disqualified, but encouraged to continue racing each day as participants.

This event attracts athletes who seek to explore the extreme in physical and mental abilities. The race is limited to 40 athletes on an invitation-only basis and attracts participants from around the world, including Argentina, Brazil, Canada, Italy, Mexico, Puerto Rico, Spain, Sweden, Slovenia and the United States. Racers must have reached their 20th birthday prior to the start of stage one.  Each racer must be accompanied by an individual support team of at least two people over the entire course.  Many support team members are volunteers from the Big community.

History
The first Ultraman Triathlon was held in 1983 and organized by Curtis Tyler, Alex Smith, and Conrad Will. Among the group Curtis Tyler served as original race director with the goal of having more than just a competition but an event which focused on the guiding principles of Hawaiian culture.... "aloha" (love), "ohana" (family), and "kokua" (help). In 1992 Tyler turned over Ultraman to Jane Bockus on the condition that there never be prize money. Jane Bockus, often referred to as "Ultra Momma", has kept the event the same with the exception of a course change in the years 2001 & 2002 with a start and finish in Kailua-Kona instead of the around the Big Island format. In 2017, Ultra Momma handed over the reins to her Assistant RD, and Sheryl Cobb took over as Race Director, with her husband David as Assistant RD. In 2018, David Cobb was added as Co-Race Director along with Sheryl. 

Popularity of the previous course remained for many years, and things changed little until the 2018 Kilauea eruption. During the eruption, lava covered part of the race course in the area of "Red Road", a favorite section of the Day 2 course. The 2018 course was altered to account for this course blockage: Day 1 became an out-and-back course, ending back at T1 in Keauhou Bay; Day 2 became a challenging ride from Kona up and over the "Saddle" before meeting up with the old course, ending at Kapaa Park near Hawi; Day 3 remained unchanged, running from Hawi back to Kona. For 2019, the Day 1 course will return to the old Kona to Volcano course. Day 2 will need to alter slightly to account for the lava on Red Road, but will start in Volcano and end in Hawi as usual, and Day 3 will remain the same.

In 1993, a second Ultraman was organized in Canada (Penticton, British Columbia) which served as a qualifier event to gain entrance to Ultraman World Championships in Hawaii until 2014. A third event, Ultraman United Kingdom began in 2011 and was held in Wales for three years. Ultraman Florida launched in the Orlando region in 2014. Ultraman Australia launched in 2015 and was held in Noosa for three years. Ultraman Canada returned as a qualifier in July 2019, and Ultraman Arizona is set to launch in March 2022.

Results

Ultraman Events 
As of June 2020, there are four existing Ultraman Triathlons. Ultraman Florida, Ultraman Canada and Ultraman Arizona all serve as qualifiers for Ultraman World Championships
Ultraman World Championships, held on the big island of Hawaii on Thanksgiving weekend at the end of November; Started in 1983.
Ultraman Florida, held in the central region of the state of Florida; Started in 2014.
Ultraman Canada, held in Penticton, British Columbia, started in July 2019 (course records)
Ultraman Arizona, held in Phoenix; starts in March 2022 (original date of March 2020 postponed due to the COVID-19 pandemic).

Gallery

See also
 Ironman Triathlon
 Ultra-Triathlon
 Long-distance swimming
 Ultramarathon
 USA Triathlon

References

External links
Ultraman World Championships
Ultraman Canada
Ultraman Florida
Ten Contestants’ Stories
USA Triathlon
Jonas Colting interview (Part 1)
Jonas Colting interview (Part 2)
220 magazine article
Ultraman World Championship - A different kind of race (YouTube)

Endurance games
Individual sports
Triathlon competitions
Multisports in the United States
Tourist attractions in Hawaii County, Hawaii
Recurring sporting events established in 1983
Sports competitions in Hawaii
1983 establishments in Hawaii